KUKI-FM is a radio station that broadcasts a country music format to Ukiah, California.

External links
 

 
 
 
 

UKI-FM